Achillea collina is a species of perennial herb in the family Asteraceae. They have simple, broad leaves and can grow up to 52 cm tall.

Sources

References 

collina
Flora of Malta